Bijou Cafe was a restaurant in Portland, Oregon's Old Town Chinatown, in the United States. The restaurant closed in 2020.

Description
Bijou Cafe was a French-inspired restaurant serving American cuisine in downtown Portland's Old Town Chinatown. Fodor's described the cafe as a "spacious, sunny" space with high ceilings and live music.

History
Bijou began serving dinner in January 2017.

The restaurant closed in 2020.

Reception
Kristi Turnquist and Michael Russell of The Oregonian included Bijou in a 2019 "ultimate guide to Portland's 40 best brunches". Donald Olson of Frommer's rated the cafe 1 out of 3 starts and wrote, "It's a good spot for breakfast and lunch (dinner is only served Fridays, but then its accompanied by live jazz). This downtown fixture has remained in business because of its fresh organic food, and because it offers some specialties that you won't find elsewhere else in Portland... It's a nice, non-scenester Portland place to know about." Thrillist has called the lunch and dinner menus "great" but said "the real highlight is the brunch specials".

See also
 Impact of the COVID-19 pandemic on the restaurant industry in the United States
 List of defunct restaurants of the United States

References

External links

 
 
 Bijou Cafe at Zomato

2020 disestablishments in Oregon
Defunct restaurants in Portland, Oregon
Old Town Chinatown
Restaurants disestablished in 2020
Restaurants disestablished during the COVID-19 pandemic
Year of establishment missing